Trevor Keith Charles Aylott (born 26 November 1957) is an English former footballer who played as a striker.

Aylott was born in Bermondsey, London. He began his football career as an apprentice with Chelsea, and went on to score 90 goals in 472 appearances in the Football League, playing for Chelsea, Barnsley, Millwall, Luton Town, Crystal Palace, A.F.C. Bournemouth, Birmingham City, Oxford United and Gillingham.

In 1984, he was in new manager Steve Coppell's first batch of signings for Crystal Palace, then a Football League Second Division club, and finished the 1984-85 season as their top scorer with eight league goals (nine in all competitions) as they finished 15th in the league.

After retiring from football in the mid-1990s, Aylott worked as a taxi driver in London.

References

1957 births
Living people
Footballers from Bermondsey
English footballers
Association football forwards
Fisher Athletic F.C. players
Chelsea F.C. players
Barnsley F.C. players
Millwall F.C. players
Luton Town F.C. players
Crystal Palace F.C. players
AFC Bournemouth players
Birmingham City F.C. players
Oxford United F.C. players
Gillingham F.C. players
Wycombe Wanderers F.C. players
Bromley F.C. players
English Football League players
National League (English football) players
British taxi drivers